Éamonn Mongey (1925 – 23 September 2007) was an Irish Gaelic footballer who played as a midfielder and as a centre-back at senior level for the Mayo county team.

A native of Castlebar, Mongey's family was steeped in the GAA. His father was president, vice-president and secretary of  Castlebar Mitchels on different occasions in the early part of the last century, and his brother Finn was also county secretary for a period.

He won an interprovincial colleges championship in 1942, and at the age of 16 had his first outing for the Mayo senior team against Roscommon in a Connacht league that replaced the National League which had been suspended because of the War. He remained a regular member of the starting fifteen until his retirement following the conclusion of the 1955 championship. During that time he won two All-Ireland medals, five Connacht medals and two National League medals.

Mongey experienced a lengthy club career with Castlebar Mitchels, winning numerous county championship medals.

Having qualified as a barrister, Mongey was appointed Registrar of the High Court in Dublin and had a doctorate in law as well as a degree in public administration. He was also a member of the Rathmines and Rathgar Musical Society.

He wrote a regular column on Gaelic football for The Sunday Press for many years.

References

1925 births
2007 deaths
Castlebar Mitchels Gaelic footballers
Connacht inter-provincial Gaelic footballers
Irish barristers
Mayo inter-county Gaelic footballers
People from Castlebar
Winners of two All-Ireland medals (Gaelic football)
Irish columnists
The Sunday Press people